Laura Kakko (14 September 1959 Helsinki – 12 March 2011 Espoo) was a Finnish Ambassador.

Kakko worked for the Red Cross in the 1980s. She attended the Foreign Affairs Ministry's International Course No. 19 in Spring 1990. In 1991-1994 she worked at the Embassy of Finland in New Delhi and in 1994–1997 at the Finnish EU Delegation in Brussels. After that, she was employed at the Ministry for Foreign Affairs at home, at the Moscow Embassy in 2000-2003 and again as a deputy head of department at the European Department in 2009, when she became Finnish Ambassador to Slovenia.

References 

Ambassadors of Finland to Slovenia
Finnish women diplomats
1959 births
2011 deaths
Diplomats from Helsinki
Finnish women ambassadors